Ivan Kolařík (22 March 1920, Valašské Meziříčí – 1 April 1942, Vizovice) was a Czechoslovak soldier and member of the anti-Nazi resistance group Out Distance. While being closely pursued by the Gestapo, he committed suicide to avoid exposing the rest of the group.

References

Czech resistance members
1920 births
1942 deaths
People from Valašské Meziříčí
Operation Anthropoid
1942 suicides
Suicides in Czechoslovakia
Suicides in the Czech Republic